Ramón Trigo is a small village in the Cerro Largo Department of eastern Uruguay.

Geography
It lies north of Fraile Muerto and Tres Islas.

Population
In 2011 Ramón Trigo had a population of 150.
 
Source: Instituto Nacional de Estadística de Uruguay

References

External links
INE map of Ramón Trigo

Populated places in the Cerro Largo Department